Maja Dimitrijević (born 30 March 1991) is a Serbian footballer who plays as a defender for Slovenian Women's League club Olimpija Ljubljana.

Club career
Dimitrijević has played for ŽFK Mašinac PZP Niš in Serbia and for FK Union Nové Zámky and Partizán Bardejov in Slovakia.

International career
Dimitrijević was capped for Serbia at senior level during the 2011 FIFA Women's World Cup qualification.

References

External links

1991 births
Living people
Serbian women's footballers
Women's association football defenders
ŽFK Mašinac PZP Niš players
FK Union Nové Zámky players
ŽNK Mura players
ŽNK Olimpija Ljubljana players
Serbia women's international footballers
Serbian expatriate women's footballers
Serbian expatriate sportspeople in Slovakia
Expatriate women's footballers in Slovakia
Serbian expatriate sportspeople in Slovenia
Expatriate women's footballers in Slovenia